Jack Scalia (born November 10, 1950) is an American actor. He has had many roles in television series (both as a regular and as a guest-star), television movies, and feature films. He is perhaps best known for his role as Chris Stamp on All My Children from 2001 to 2003.

Early life
Scalia was born Giacomo Tomaso Tedesco in Brooklyn, New York City, of Italian and Irish descent. His father was former Brooklyn Dodger Rocky Tedesco. His parents divorced and when his mother remarried his name was changed to Scalia. In 1969 he graduated from Brentwood High School on Long Island. He was drafted third by the Montreal Expos in 1971 as a pitcher. He was injured and never played in the Major Leagues.

Acting career
He began his career as a clothes model, most notably in a series of ads for Eminence briefs and Jordache jeans, both of which capitalized on his "beefcake" appeal. In 1982, to promote his TV series, The Devlin Connection, Scalia took off his shirt and posed, cigarette in hand, for a pin-up wall poster.

Scalia was a regular cast member during the final season of Remington Steele in 1987, after which he joined the cast of Dallas in the role of Nicholas Pearce, love interest to Sue Ellen Ewing (Linda Gray).  Scalia's character was killed off at the end of the 1987–1988 season when he fell to his death after being pushed from a balcony during a fight with J. R. Ewing (Larry Hagman). He returned to the series finale in a dream sequence in which he was married to Sue Ellen.

From 1989 to 1990 he starred in another TV series, the CBS crime drama Wolf.

In 1992 Scalia was cast as Detective Nico "Nick" Bonetti in the short-lived television series Tequila and Bonetti.  Scalia replaced another actor in the role during production of the show's first episode. Eight years later, in 2000, Scalia reprised the role of Bonetti in a revival of the series, which was filmed and aired in Italy.

From 1994 to 1995 he starred in Pointman, a television series on the Prime Time Entertainment Network. He was an investment banker framed and convicted of fraud. When eventually cleared, Constantine "Connie" Harper becomes the owner of a Florida beach resort, Spanish Pete's, and aids people in need with the use of former prison mates and "the list".

Scalia is also known for his role as Chris Stamp on All My Children from 2001 to 2003. He was nominated for a Daytime Emmy Award for "Outstanding Lead Actor" for his AMC role in 2002. In 2006, Scalia starred as President Halstrom in The Genius Club for writer/director Tim Chey. The film is about seven geniuses who must try to solve the world's problems in one night.

Charity work

Operation American Spirit
In 2007 Scalia co-founded Operation American Spirit with Edra Blixseth. The charity was founded to raise awareness and funding for severely injured troops and their families. In a press conference Scalia stated he started the charity in hopes of raising one hundred million dollars for wounded veterans.

The group organized two 1,500-mile bike rides which took place in 2007 and 2008. The rides took place along the West Coast and were intended to raise both awareness and charitable funds for wounded veterans. The tours made stops to interact with veterans at VA hospitals. The group claimed to have raised $88,937 in 2007 and $14,490 in 2008 according to tax filings, though no charitable recipients were ever revealed. According to a July 3, 2011 report by the New York Post, the IRS revoked the tax-exempt status from the "9-11-01 Lest We Forget" charitable group for failing to file a tax return in its decade of existence. That same year the Operation American Spirit charity was suspended by California authorities because of lapses in paying taxes and fees.

Scalia was not the financial chair of the non-profits and told the Post he "couldn't remember who received the money collected" by the fundraising effort. His lawyer, Dennis Holahan, mentioned two charities which benefited. No legal recourse has been taken against Scalia, who has maintained his innocence. Co-founder and former billionaire Tim Blixseth, however, found himself in trouble with the law on projects outside of the charity.

Coalition to Salute America's Heroes
In 2009, while filming The Black Tulip, Scalia spent time visiting servicemen and women. Since then he has been a host or speaker for various events on different military bases. He is currently an ambassador for the Coalition to Salute America's Heroes. The Coalition is a 501c3 charity dedicated to making the lives of wounded veterans returning home to be better prepared for the challenges that lie ahead.

Scalia continues to serve warriors everywhere, including participating in the 2016 Pearl Harbor 75th Anniversary Memorial Parade and hosting the 105th birthday celebration for WWII veteran Ray Chavez. Scalia met the 104 year old Chavez on the USS Missouri in December 2016 when he hosted an event to commemorate the 75th Anniversary of Pearl Harbor (which included the governors of Hawaii and Arizona). After the event Scalia, 9/11 firefighter Joe Torrillo, and patriotic rocker Jeff Senour came up with the ultimate honor for Chavez. On March 11, 2017, more than 600 people were treated to a patriotic concert in Chavez' honor, as the oldest living Pearl Harbor veteran was showered with presents, a four-foot cake, letters from one sitting and four past U.S. Presidents, and an outpouring of love and national media attention.

In a 2017 interview on Good Day New York, Scalia talked about his multiple tours to Mosul for humanitarian missions.

Personal life
He was previously married to former model Joan Rankin and to 1982 Miss Universe Karen Baldwin, with whom he has two daughters.

Filmography

References

External links

Jack Scalia on AllMovie
Jack Scalia Actor * Patriot

1950 births
20th-century American male actors
21st-century American male actors
American male film actors
American male television actors
American people of Irish descent
American people of Italian descent
Brentwood High School (Brentwood, New York) alumni
Living people
Male actors from New York City
Male models from New York (state)
People from Brooklyn